David B. Stephenson is a British academic and Professor of Statistical Climatology at the University of Exeter known for his use of statistical
modelling in atmospheric and climate science.
He is founder and director of the Exeter Climate Systems research centre and also the Head of Statistical Science at the University of Exeter.

He was one of the authors of Chapter 14 of Intergovernmental Panel on Climate Change's fifth assessment report. He is an elected member of the Academia Europaea.

Together with IT Joliffe, he edited Forecast verification: a practitioner's guide in atmospheric science (John Wiley & Sons, 2nd ed. 2012), which has been cited over 2200 times.

Awards
Royal Meteorological Society's Adrian Gill Award (2012)

Royal Society Wolfson Research Merit Award (2015)

Career
He received a 1st class Honours degree in Physics at Oxford University (1982-1985) and received a PhD in Theoretical Particle Physics from Edinburgh University (1982-1988) (supervised by Profs. Peter Higgs and Richard Kenway)

References

External links
 
David Stephenson at Google Scholar
Exeter Climate Systems

Academics of the University of Exeter
British climatologists
21st-century British mathematicians
1963 births
Living people
Academics of the University of Reading
Royal Society Wolfson Research Merit Award holders